Rockford School District is a school district located in Rockford, Minnesota. The district comprises three schools, Rockford Elementary Arts Magnet School, Rockford Middle School, and Rockford High School.

The district mascot is the Rockets.

References
School districts in Minnesota
Education in Wright County, Minnesota
Education in Hennepin County, Minnesota

 https://www.rockford.k12.mn.us/